Greg Johnson (born 7 January 1968) is a New Zealand singer songwriter.

Music career
Johnson was born in Auckland, New Zealand. Starting out in school orchestras and choirs, Johnson quickly graduated to the early New Wave scene playing in bands from age 15 at many of the infamous live venues that scattered NZ and post punk years, including Mainstreet Cabaret, the Reverb Room, The Windsor Castle and The Esplanade Hotel.

In 1987, he signed with Trevor Reekie, who owned indie label Pagan Records, releasing an EP under the name This Boy Rob before starting The Greg Johnson Set with Nigel Russell of The Spelling Mistakes, Danse Macabre and The Car Crash Set. The band recorded an album The Watertable 1989 followed by "Everyday Distortions" 1991. The single, "Isabelle", produced by Mark Tierney appeared on the New Zealand charts and reached to number 4.

In 1995, he signed with EMI Records. He released Vine Street Stories which was produced and recorded at his Auckland home. Chinese Whispers and Seabreeze Motel followed.

Johnson moved to Los Angeles in 2002 after signing a contract with Immergent Records. Johnson released the albums Here Comes The Caviar in 2004 and Anyone Can Say Goodbye in 2006. This was followed by Seven Day Cure, Secret Weapon, Exits, and then Swing The Lantern.

In 2005, Johnson performed a collection of his songs with The Auckland Philharmonia Orchestra at Auckland's Aotea Concert Hall. In 2008 he and Wayne Bell performed a set on an Air New Zealand 747 between Los Angeles and Auckland.

Johnson won New Zealand's Top Male Vocalist at New Zealand Music Awards in 1995 and in 2002 Best Compilation for his album The Best Yet.

In 1997, Johnson won the APRA Silver Scroll, New Zealand's most prestigious Songwriting Award with his tune Liberty from the album Chinese Whispers. Other Johnson finalists for the Silver Scroll have included Isabelle, Hold Tight and Boxers hands. His songs have been covered by Artists including "Grada" "Strawpeople" "Mel Parsons" and Eyreton Hall.

In 2002, he won NZ Tui Best Compilation Album 2003 for 'The Best Yet'. In 2005, his song Save Yourself from the album Here Comes The Caviar broke on over 50 US Adult Alternative Radio stations. Johnson and his band toured the US extensively, doing many radio concerts and arts festivals including a sell-out show at Boston's Paradise Lounge in August 2006.

Other songs that received airplay on college radio in the USA included Horses and Now The Sun Is Out; the latter was also the most played New Zealand song on NZ radio in 2006. Johnson wrote or co-wrote songs for Strawpeople, Mozella, Richard Rudolph and Gordon Pogoda.

Songs from Johnson have previously been placed in TV shows, The Hills, Party of Five, Beautiful People, High School Reunion, Road Rules, Castle, The Brokenwood Mysteries, and 800 Words. Film score and placements include Fifty Pills and Last Chance Harvey. In 2018 Johnson Scored the award winning Feature length Documentary on the New Zealand wine story A Seat At The Table by Republik Films which won 2019 Best Of The Fest at the Vancouver International Film Festival.

His music was used in an interview in Austin Mitchell's Pavlova Paradise Revisited in 2002. In 2007, his song Hold Tight was used in the New Zealand drama series Shortland Street during the wedding of characters Sarah Potts and TK Samuels.

He continues to tour frequently in New Zealand, Australia, USA, and Europe. In 2018-19, he toured with his Every Song has A Story show which features visuals and stories behind the songs and albums.

In 2020 he produced a compilation of all his songs and albums to date, titled The Digital Box. This coincided with the release of his 2021 album, Tilt Your Interior.

Discography

Studio albums

Compilation albums

Live albums

Singles

Bluespeak discography

Late Last Night (1992)
The Drinking Set
Dark Blue (1999)

Awards
 NZ Tui Top Male Vocalist 1995
 Winner APRA Silver Scroll for songwriting 1997 with the song "Liberty"
 NZ Tui Best Compilation Album 2003 for "The Best Yet"

Personal life 
Since 2002 he has been a resident of the United States, living in California.

References

External links
AudioCulture
Greg Johnson's site
Music Net NZ - Greg Johnson
Record Company Bio
NZ On Screen - Pavlova Paradise Revisited

1968 births
APRA Award winners
Living people
New Zealand pop singers